Iranian Call and Reform Organization is a Sunni Islamist political organization in Iran. The majority of its members are Kurdish, roughly making up half of the organization. It is not legally registered as a political group, however like reformists in Iran, it seeks reforms in the government while complying within the framework of Iranian government.

The party is allegedly tied with the Muslim Brotherhood, however it states there is no affiliation.

According to Ali Rebaz, a senior Kurdistan Islamic Union politician, the two parties have good relations with each other.

References

External links

1980 establishments in Iran
Islamic democratic political parties
Islamic political parties in Iran
Kurdish Islamic organisations
Kurdish Islamism
Kurdish political parties in Iran
Muslim Brotherhood
Political parties established in 1980
Sunni Islamic political parties